Bajpai (or Vajpayee) is a Hindu Brahmin surname of Indian origin.

Notable individuals with this surname include:
 Atal Bihari Vajpayee (1924–2018), Prime Minister of India
 Bhagwati Dhar Vajpayee (died 2021), Indian journalist
 Girija Shankar Bajpai (1891–1954), knighted, first Minister of External Affairs
 Kanti Bajpai, Indian academic-analyst and former headmaster of The Doon School
 Manikchandra Vajpayee (1919–2005), Indian journalist and writer
 Manoj Bajpayee (also Bajpai; born 1969), Indian actor
 Pia Bajpiee (born 1992), Indian film actress and model, who appears primarily in South Indian films
 Punya Prasun Bajpai (born 1964), Indian journalist and TV anchor
 Rajendra Kumari Bajpai (1925–1998), Indian politician, represented Sitapur

 Tia Bajpai (born 1989), Indian singer, television and film actress
 Uma Shankar Bajpai (1921/1922–2005), Indian diplomat and journalist
 Nandini Bajpai (Born 1968), Children’s book author

See also
 
 

Indian surnames